"Tis So Sweet to Trust in Jesus" is a Christian hymn with music by William J. Kirkpatrick and lyrics by Louisa M. R. Stead. The lyrics were written in 1882. They appeared in Stead's Songs of Triumph.

The song is included in many hymnals and has been recorded by many artists.and people

Lyrics

'Tis so sweet to trust in Jesus,
Just to take Him at His Word;
Just to rest upon His promise,
Just to know, "Thus says the Lord!"

Refrain:
Jesus, Jesus, how I trust Him!
How I've proved Him o'er and o'er
Jesus, Jesus, precious Jesus!
O for grace to trust Him more!

O how sweet to trust in Jesus,
Just to trust His cleansing blood;
Just in simple faith to plunge me
'Neath the healing, cleansing flood!

Refrain

Yes, 'tis sweet to trust in Jesus,
Just from sin and self to cease;
Just from Jesus simply taking
Life and rest, and joy and peace.

Refrain

I'm so glad I learned to trust Thee,
Precious Jesus, Savior, Friend;
And I know that Thou art with me,
Wilt be with me to the end.

Refrain

References

External links
 The story behind "Rock of Ages" and a brief biography of Toplady

American Christian hymns
1882 songs
Songs about Jesus
Protestant hymns
19th-century hymns